Moniliella is a genus of fungi in the subdivision Ustilaginomycotina. It is in the monotypic family Moniliellaceae , which is in the monotypic order Moniliellales  which is in the monotypic class Moniliellomycetes .

The family, order and class were originally labelled as incertae sedis. Until 2014, when Moniliellaceae was formed.

Some species of Moniliella can cause disease in humans, and also in cats. The genus includes the black, yeast-like fungi in the Basidiomycota, although the black, yeast-like fungi also include some species from the Ascomycota.

Distribution
It has a scattered distribution, found in North and South America, Europe and Asia.

Species
List of species:

Moniliella acetoabutans 
Moniliella byzovii 
Moniliella carnis 
Moniliella casei 
Moniliella dehoogii 
Moniliella fonsecae
Moniliella floricola 
Moniliella macrospora 
Moniliella madida (formerly in Trichosporonoides)
Moniliella megachiliensis (formerly in Trichosporonoides)
Moniliella nigrescens (formerly in Trichosporonoides)
Moniliella oedocephalis (formerly in Trichosporonoides)
Moniliella pollinis 
Moniliella pyrgileucina 
Moniliella sojae 
Moniliella spathulata (formerly in Trichosporonoides)
Moniliella tomentosa , an osmophile

Former species;
 M. mellis  = Zygosaccharomyces mellis, Saccharomycetaceae
 M. suaveolens  = Vanrija humicola, Trichosporonaceae
 M. suaveolens var. nigra  = Saprochaete suaveolens, Dipodascaceae
 M. tomentosa var. pollinis  = Moniliella pollinis, Moniliellaceae

References

Basidiomycota genera
Ustilaginomycotina